Carte de Séjour  was a French band composed of Rachid Taha (vocals), Mohamed Amini (guitar), Moktar Amini (bass), and Jérôme Savy (lead guitar).

History
Carte de Séjour was founded in 1980 by Rachid Taha, Djamel Dif, Mokhtar Amini, Mohamed Amini and Éric Vaquer (guitar). Jérôme Savy, former guitarist of the French garage rock band Arsenic, replaced Vaquer some time later. The band's name was a reference to the residence card carried by immigrants in France.

After a major concert at the Palais des sports and performance at Place de la Bastille during the Marche des beurs, the band gained prominence with their rendition of Charles Trenet's .  Carte de Séjour's cover of the well-known song played an important role in raising questions about the status of the Beurs and other descendants of postcolonial immigrants in France, as well as the struggle against mounting right-wing and racist policies of Front national in France.

The group included in its repertoire pop, rock, punk rock, traditional Arab music and gnawa music.

The band split in 1990, after personnel changes and internal strife. Rachid Taha established a solo career and was considered one of the major singers of raï.

Members of the group
Rachid Taha – lead vocals and composition (d. 2018)
Djamel Dif - drums and composition on the first maxi single (except for "Halouf Nar")
Mokhtar Amini – bass guitar, arrangements, composition
Jérôme Savy – guitars, composition, arrangements replacing Éric Vaquer after he quit in May 1982
Mohamed Amini – guitars, composition, arrangements

Discography
 1982: Carte de séjour (maxi 45 rpm)
 1983 Carte De Séjour
 1984 Bleu De Marseille
 1984 Rhorhomanie
 1986 
 1986 2½ (Deux Et Demi)
 1987 Ramsa
 1987 Ramsa (Cinq)

References

French rock music groups
Musical groups established in 1980
Musical groups disestablished in 1990
1980 establishments in France
1990 disestablishments in France